NGC 5001 is a barred spiral galaxy located in the constellation Ursa Major. It is designated as SB in the galaxy morphological classification scheme. It was discovered by John Herschel on 1 May 1831. It is at a distance of 130 million parsecs from the Earth.

See also 
 List of NGC objects (5001–6000)
 List of NGC objects
 List of spiral galaxies

References

External links 
 

Barred spiral galaxies
08243
5001
Ursa Major (constellation)
45631